Jim Anderson may refer to:

Sports
Jim Anderson (footballer) (1869–1947), Australian rules footballer with Essendon, 1892–1905
Jim Anderson (ice hockey) (1930–2013), NHL hockey player and coach
Jim Anderson (basketball) (born 1937), American retired basketball coach
Jim Anderson (American football) (born 1947), American football player and coach
Jim Anderson (baseball) (born 1957), former Major League Baseball player
Jim Anderson (swimmer) (born 1963), Scottish swimmer

Other
Jim Anderson (loyalist) (1931–2019), Northern Irish loyalist
Jim Anderson (editor) (born 1937), editor of the magazine Oz and author
Jim Anderson (Australian politician) (1943–2003), New South Wales politician
Jim Anderson (American politician) (born 1943), Wyoming politician
Jim Anderson (sound engineer), sound engineer and producer
Jim Anderson, the title character from the series Father Knows Best

See also
James Anderson (disambiguation)
Jimmy Anderson (disambiguation)
James Andersen (disambiguation)